Palm oil is an edible vegetable oil derived from the mesocarp (reddish pulp) of the fruit of the oil palms. The oil is used in food manufacturing, in beauty products, and as biofuel. Palm oil accounted for about 33% of global oils produced from oil crops in 2014. Palm oils are easier to stabilize and maintain quality of flavor and consistency in processed foods, so are frequently favored by food manufacturers.  On average globally, humans consumed 7.7 kg (17 lb) of palm oil per person in 2015. Demand has also increased for other uses, such as cosmetics and biofuels, creating more demand on the supply encouraging the growth of palm oil plantations in tropical countries.

The use of palm oil has attracted the concern of environmental groups due to deforestation in the tropics where palms are grown, and has been cited as a factor in social problems due to allegations of human rights violations among growers. An industry group formed in 2004 to create more sustainable and ethical palm oil, through the Roundtable on Sustainable Palm Oil. However, very little palm oil is certified through the organization, and some groups have criticized it as greenwashing. In 2018, a report by the International Union for Conservation of Nature acknowledged that palm oil is much more efficient than other oils in terms of land and water usage, however deforestation causes more biodiversity loss than switching to other oils.

The biggest producers of palm oil are Indonesia, Malaysia, Thailand, and Nigeria. Indonesia produces biodiesel primarily from palm oil. Since agricultural land is limited, in order to plant monocultures of oil palms, land used for other cultivations or the tropical forest need to be cleared. A major environmental threat is then the destruction of rainforests in Indonesia.

History

Humans used oil palms as far back as 5,000 years. In the late 1800s, archaeologists discovered a substance that they concluded was originally palm oil in a tomb at Abydos dating back to 3,000 BCE.

Palm oil from Elaeis guineensis has long been recognized in West and Central African countries, used widely as a cooking oil. European merchants trading with West Africa occasionally purchased palm oil for use as a cooking oil in Europe.

Palm oil became a highly sought-after commodity by British traders for use as an industrial lubricant for machinery during Britain's Industrial Revolution. Palm oil formed the basis of soap products, such as Lever Brothers' (now Unilever) "Sunlight" soap, and the American Palmolive brand.

By around 1870, palm oil constituted the primary export of some West African countries, although this was overtaken by cocoa in the 1880s with the introduction of colonial European cocoa plantations.

Processing

Palm oil is naturally reddish in color because of a high beta-carotene content. It is not to be confused with palm kernel oil derived from the kernel of the same fruit or coconut oil derived from the kernel of the coconut palm (Cocos nucifera). The differences are in color (raw palm kernel oil lacks carotenoids and is not red), and in saturated fat content: palm mesocarp oil is 49% saturated, while palm kernel oil and coconut oil are 81% and 86% saturated fats, respectively. However, crude red palm oil that has been refined, neutralized, bleached and deodorized, a common commodity called RBD (refined, bleached, and deodorized) palm oil, does not contain carotenoids. Many industrial food applications of palm oil use fractionated components of palm oil (often listed as "modified palm oil") whose saturation levels can reach 90%; these "modified" palm oils can become highly saturated, but are not necessarily hydrogenated.

The oil palm produces bunches containing many fruits with the fleshy mesocarp enclosing a kernel that is covered by a very hard shell. The FAO considers palm oil (coming from the pulp) and palm kernels to be primary products. The oil extraction rate from a bunch varies from 17 to 27% for palm oil, and from 4 to 10% for palm kernels.

Along with coconut oil, palm oil is one of the few highly saturated vegetable fats and is semisolid at room temperature. Palm oil is a common cooking ingredient in the tropical belt of Africa, Southeast Asia and parts of Brazil. Its use in the commercial food industry in other parts of the world is widespread because of its lower cost and the high oxidative stability (saturation) of the refined product when used for frying. One source reported that humans consumed an average  of palm oil per person in 2015.

Many processed foods either contain palm oil or various ingredients made from it.

Refining

After milling, various palm oil products are made using refining processes. First is fractionation, with crystallization and separation processes to obtain solid (palm stearin), and liquid (olein) fractions. Then melting and degumming removes impurities. Then the oil is filtered and bleached. Physical refining removes smells and coloration to produce "refined, bleached and deodorized palm oil" (RBDPO) and free fatty acids, which are used in the manufacture of soaps, washing powder and other products. RBDPO is the basic palm oil product sold on the world's commodity markets. Many companies fractionate it further to produce palm oil for cooking oil, or process it into other products.

Red palm oil
Since the mid-1990s, red palm oil has been cold-pressed from the fruit of the oil palm and bottled for use as a cooking oil, in addition to other uses such as being blended into mayonnaise and vegetable oil.

Oil produced from palm fruit is called red palm oil or just palm oil. It is around 50% saturated fat—considerably less than palm kernel oil—and 40% unsaturated fat and 10% polyunsaturated fat. In its unprocessed state, red palm oil has an intense deep red color because of its abundant carotene content. Red palm oil also contains sterols, vitamin E, and carotenoids such as alpha-carotene, beta-carotene, and lycopene.

White palm oil 
White palm oil is the result of processing and refining. When refined, the palm oil loses its deep red color. It is extensively used in food manufacture and can be found in a variety of processed foods including peanut butter and chips. It is often labeled as palm shortening and is used as a replacement ingredient for hydrogenated fats in a variety of baked and fried products.

Uses

In food
The highly saturated nature of palm oil renders it solid at room temperature in temperate regions, making it a cheap substitute for butter or hydrogenated vegetable oils in uses where solid fat is desirable, such as the making of pastry dough and baked goods. Palm oil is used in West African cuisine such as egusi soup and okra soup. The health concerns related to trans fats in hydrogenated vegetable oils may have contributed to the increasing use of palm oil in the food industry. Palm oil is sometimes used as a minor ingredient in calf milk replacer.

Non-food consumer products 
Palm oil is pervasively used in personal care and cleaning products, and it provides the foaming agent in nearly every soap, shampoo, or detergent. Around 70% of personal care products including soap, shampoo, makeup, and lotion, contain ingredients derived from palm oil. However, there are more than 200 different names for these palm oil ingredients and only 10% of them include the word “palm".

Biomass and biofuels
Palm oil is used to produce both methyl ester and hydrodeoxygenated biodiesel. Palm oil methyl ester is created through a process called transesterification. Palm oil biodiesel is often blended with other fuels to create palm oil biodiesel blends. Palm oil biodiesel meets the European EN 14214 standard for biodiesels. Hydrodeoxygenated biodiesel is produced by direct hydrogenolysis of the fat into alkanes and propane. The world's largest palm oil biodiesel plant is the €550 million Finnish-operated Neste Oil biodiesel plant in Singapore, which opened in 2011 with a capacity of 800,000 tons per year and produces hydrodeoxygenated NEXBTL biodiesel from palm oil imported from Malaysia and Indonesia.

Significant amounts of palm oil exports to Europe are converted to biodiesel (as of early 2018: Indonesia: 40%, Malaysia 30%). In 2014, almost half of all the palm oil in Europe was burned as car and truck fuel.  As of 2018, one-half of Europe's palm oil imports were used for biodiesel.  Use of palm oil as biodiesel generates three times the carbon emissions as using fossil fuel, and, for example, "biodiesel made from Indonesian palm oil makes the global carbon problem worse, not better."

There are pressures for increased oil palm production from Indonesian palm-based biodiesel programs. The biodiesel currently contains a 30:70 palm oil to conventional diesel ratio (known as B30) at the gas pumps. The Indonesian government is aiming to produce 100% palm oil biodiesel (or B100) to transition out of using conventional diesel. The Indonesian government has estimated it would need to establish approximately 15 million hectares of oil palm plantations to meet these future demands.

The organic waste matter that is produced when processing oil palm, including oil palm shells and oil palm fruit bunches, can also be used to produce energy. This waste material can be converted into pellets that can be used as a biofuel. Additionally, palm oil that has been used to fry foods can be converted into methyl esters for biodiesel. The used cooking oil is chemically treated to create a biodiesel similar to petroleum diesel.

In wound care
Although palm oil is applied to wounds for its supposed antimicrobial  effects, research does not confirm its effectiveness.

Production

The annual production of palm oil is projected to reach  by 2050. During the 2022 food crises instigated by the Russian invasion of Ukraine and crop failures in other parts of the world due to extreme weather caused by climate change, the Indonesian government banned exports of palm oil. This combined with a reduced harvest in Malaysia greatly increased global prices, while reducing availability causing ripple effects in the global supply chain. On 23 May 2022, the Indonesian government reopened trading hoping to balance supplies.

Indonesia

Indonesia expects to double production by the end of 2030. At the end of 2010, 60% of the output was exported in the form of crude palm oil.

Malaysia

Malaysia is the world's second largest producer of palm oil. In 1992, in response to concerns about deforestation, the Government of Malaysia pledged to limit the expansion of palm oil plantations by retaining a minimum of half the nation's land as forest cover.

Though Indonesia produces more palm oil, Malaysia is the world's largest exporter of palm oil having exported  of palm oil products in 2011. India, China, Pakistan, the European Union and the United States are the primary importers of Malaysian palm oil products. In 2016, palm oil prices jumped to a four-year high days after Trump's election victory in the US.

Nigeria
As of 2018, Nigeria was the third-largest producer, with approximately  under cultivation. Until 1934, Nigeria had been the world's largest producer. Both small- and large-scale producers participated in the industry.

Thailand
Nearly all of Thai production is consumed locally. Almost 85% of palm plantations and extraction mills are in south Thailand. At year-end 2016, 4.7 to 5.8 million rai were planted in oil palms, employing 300,000 farmers, mostly on small landholdings of 20 rai. Indonesia accounts for 52% of world exports. Malaysian exports total 38%. The biggest consumers of palm oil are India, the European Union, and China, with the three consuming nearly 50% of world exports. Thailand's Department of Internal Trade (DIT) usually sets the price of crude palm oil and refined palm oil Thai farmers have a relatively low yield compared to those in Malaysia and Indonesia. Thai palm oil crops yield 4–17% oil compared to around 20% in competing countries. In addition, Indonesian and Malaysian oil palm plantations are 10 times the size of Thai plantations.

Benin
Palm is native to the wetlands of western Africa, and south Benin already hosts many palm plantations. Its 'Agricultural Revival Programme' has identified many thousands of hectares of land as suitable for new oil palm export plantations. In spite of the economic benefits, Non-governmental organisations (NGOs), such as Nature Tropicale, claim biofuels will compete with domestic food production in some existing prime agricultural sites. Other areas comprise peat land, whose drainage would have a deleterious environmental impact. They are also concerned genetically modified plants will be introduced into the region, jeopardizing the current premium paid for their non-GM crops.

According to recent article by National Geographic, most palm oil in Benin is still produced by women for domestic use. The FAO additionally states that peasants in Benin practice agroecology. They harvest palm fruit from small farms and the palm oil is mostly used for local consumption.

Cameroon
Cameroon had a production project underway initiated by Herakles Farms in the US. However, the project was halted under the pressure of civil society organizations in Cameroon. Before the project was halted, Herakles left the Roundtable on Sustainable Palm Oil early in negotiations. The project has been controversial due to opposition from villagers and the location of the project in a sensitive region for biodiversity.

Colombia
In 2018, total palm oil production in Colombia reached , representing some 8% of national agricultural GDP and benefiting mainly smallholders (65% of Colombia's palm oil sector). According to a study from the Environmental, Science and Policy, Colombia has the potential to produce sustainable palm oil without causing deforestation. In addition, palm oil and other crops provide a productive alternative for illegal crops, like coca.

Ecuador

Ecuador aims to help palm oil producers switch to sustainable methods and achieve RSPO certification under initiatives to develop greener industries.

Ghana
Ghana has a lot of palm nut species, which may become an important contributor to the agriculture of the region. Although Ghana has multiple palm species, ranging from local palm nuts to other species locally called agric, it was only marketed locally and to neighboring countries. Production is now expanding as major investment funds are purchasing plantations, because Ghana is considered a major growth area for palm oil.

Kenya
The rest is imported at a cost of around US$140 million a year, making edible oil the country's second most important import after petroleum. Since 1993 a new hybrid variety of cold-tolerant, high-yielding oil palm has been promoted by the Food and Agriculture Organization of the United Nations in western Kenya. As well as alleviating the country's deficit of edible oils while providing an important cash crop, it is claimed to have environmental benefits in the region, because it does not compete against food crops or native vegetation and it provides stabilisation for the soil.

Myanmar 
Palm oil was introduced to British Burma (now Myanmar) in the 1920s. Beginning in the 1970s, smaller-scale palm oil plantations were developed in Tanintharyi Region, and Mon, Kayin, and Rakhine States. In 1999, the ruling military junta, the State Peace and Development Council, initiated the large-scale development of such plantations, especially in Tanintharyi, the southernmost region of Myanmar. As of 2019, over 401,814 ha of palm oil concessions have been awarded to 44 companies. 60% of the awarded concessions consist of forests and native vegetation, and some concessions overlap with national parks, including Tanintharyi and Lenya National Parks, which have seen deforestation and threaten conservation efforts for endemic species like the Indochinese tiger.

Social and environmental impacts

Forests have been cleared in parts of Indonesia and Malaysia to make space for oil-palm monoculture. This has significant impacts on the local ecosystems leading to deforestation and biodiversity loss. For example, these processes have resulted in significant acreage losses of the natural habitat of the three surviving species of orangutan. One species in particular, the Sumatran orangutan, has been listed as critically endangered because of habitat loss due to palm oil cultivation.

Social

In addition to environmental concerns, palm oil development in regions that produce it has also led to significant social conflict. Regions with fast growing palm oil production have experienced significant violations of indigenous land rights, influxes of illegal immigrant labor and labor practices, and other alleged related human rights violations.

The palm oil industry has had both positive and negative impacts on workers, indigenous peoples and residents of palm oil-producing communities. Palm oil production provides employment opportunities, and has been shown to improve infrastructure, social services and reduce poverty. However, in some cases, oil palm plantations have developed lands without consultation or compensation of the indigenous people inhabiting the land, resulting in social conflict. The use of illegal immigrants in Malaysia has also raised concerns about working conditions within the palm oil industry.
 
Some social initiatives use palm oil cultivation as part of poverty alleviation strategies. Examples include the UN Food and Agriculture Organisation's hybrid oil palm project in Western Kenya, which improves incomes and diets of local populations, and Malaysia's Federal Land Development Authority and Federal Land Consolidation and Rehabilitation Authority, which both support rural development.

Food vs. fuel

The use of palm oil in the production of biodiesel has led to concerns that the need for fuel is being placed ahead of the need for food, leading to malnutrition in developing nations. This is known as the food versus fuel debate. According to a 2008 report published in the Renewable and Sustainable Energy Reviews, palm oil was determined to be a sustainable source of both food and biofuel, and the production of palm oil biodiesel does not pose a threat to edible palm oil supplies. According to a 2009 study published in the Environmental Science and Policy journal, palm oil biodiesel might increase the demand for palm oil in the future, resulting in the expansion of palm oil production, and therefore an increased supply of food.

Human rights 
One report indicated numerous allegations of human rights violations in the production of palm oil in Indonesia and Malaysia, including exposure to hazardous pesticides, child labor, and rape and sexual abuse, and unsafe carrying loads. These incidents may receive no response by the company or police, or are left unreported because victims fear retaliation from their abuser. The chemicals used in the pesticides, such as paraquat and glyphosate, have been linked to diseases such as Parkinson's disease and cancer.

Reports of Indigenous peoples and communities in Indonesia, indicate  losing farmland and traditionally significant land due to palm oil industry expansion. In 2017, there were over 650 different land disputes between palm oil plantations and Indigenous land owners. Indigenous communities also expressed concern over the loss of natural resources, such as wild rubber, reed, and adat forests (communal forests). Indigenous communities have made some ground when it comes to land disputes, either through protest or legal means.

Other concerns when it comes to Indigenous communities being impacted include lack of government oversight on palm oil plantations, political corruption, or the lacking of enforcement on laws meant to protect Indigenous lands. In countries such as Guatemala, palm oil plantation have significant pressure on local police forces, leading to local police to disregard land claims, going as far as using force to break up protests, and even murdering local leaders.

Environmental

While only 5% of the world's vegetable oil farmland is used for palm plantations, palm cultivation produces 38% of the world's total vegetable oil supply. In terms of oil yield, a palm plantation is 10 times more productive than soybean, sunflower or rapeseed cultivation because the palm fruit and kernel both provide usable oil. Palm oil has garnered criticism from environmentalists due to the environmental importance of where it is grown. However, it is indisputably more efficient in comparison to other oil-producing plants. In 2016, it was found that palm oil farms produce around 4.17 metric tons of oil per hectare. By contrast other oils, such as sunflower, soybean, or peanut only produce 0.56, 0.39, and 0.16 metric tons respectively per hectare. Palm oil is the most sustainable vegetable oil in terms of yield, requiring one-ninth of land used by other vegetable oil crops. In the future, laboratory-grown microbes might achieve higher yields per unit of land at comparable prices.

However, palm oil cultivation has been criticized for its impact on the natural environment, including deforestation, loss of natural habitats, and greenhouse gas emissions which have threatened critically endangered species, such as the orangutan and Sumatran tiger. Slash-and-burn techniques are still used to create new plantations across palm oil producing countries. From January to September 2019, 857,000 hectares of land was burned in Indonesia; peatlands accounted for more than a quarter of the burned area.

Environmental groups such as Greenpeace and Friends of the Earth oppose the use of palm oil biofuels, claiming that the deforestation caused by oil palm plantations is more damaging for the climate than the benefits gained by switching to biofuel and using the palms as carbon sinks.

A 2018 study by the International Union for Conservation of Nature (IUCN) concluded that palm oil is "here to stay" due to its higher productivity compared with many other vegetable oils. The IUCN maintains that replacing palm oil with other vegetable oils would necessitate greater amounts of agricultural land, negatively affecting biodiversity. The IUCN advocates better practices in the palm oil industry, including the prevention of plantations from expanding into forested regions and creating a demand for certified and sustainable palm oil products.

In 2019, the Rainforest Action Network surveyed eight global brands involved in palm oil extraction in the Leuser Ecosystem, and said that none was performing adequately in avoiding “conflict palm oil”. Many of the companies told the Guardian they were working to improve their performance. A WWF scorecard rated only 15 out of 173 companies as performing well.

In 2020 a study by Chain Reaction Research concluded that NDPE (No Deforestation, No Peat, No Exploitation) policies cover 83% of palm oil refineries. NDPE policies are according to the Chain Reaction Research the most effective private mechanism to cut the direct link with deforestation, due to the economic leverage refineries have over palm oil growers.

Markets
According to the Hamburg-based Oil World trade journal, in 2008 global production of oils and fats stood at 160 million tonnes. Palm oil and palm kernel oil were jointly the largest contributor, accounting for 48 million tonnes, or 30% of the total output. Soybean oil came in second with 37 million tonnes (23%). About 38% of the oils and fats produced in the world were shipped across oceans. Of the 60 million tonnes of oils and fats exported around the world, palm oil and palm kernel oil made up close to 60%; Malaysia, with 45% of the market share, dominated the palm oil trade. Production of palm oil that complies with voluntary sustainability standards is growing at a faster rate than conventional production. Standard-compliant production increased by 110% from 2008 to 2016, while conventional production increased by 2%.

Food label regulations
Previously, palm oil could be listed as "vegetable fat" or "vegetable oil" on food labels in the European Union (EU). From December 2014, food packaging in the EU is no longer allowed to use the generic terms "vegetable fat" or "vegetable oil" in the ingredients list. Food producers are required to list the specific type of vegetable fat used, including palm oil.  Vegetable oils and fats can be grouped together in the ingredients list under the term "vegetable oils" or "vegetable fats" but this must be followed by the type of vegetable origin (e.g., palm, sunflower, or rapeseed) and the phrase "in varying proportions".

Supply chain institutions

Consumer Goods Forum 
In 2010, the Consumer Goods Forum passed a resolution that its members would reduce deforestation through their palm oil supply to net zero by 2020.

Roundtable on Sustainable Palm Oil (RSPO) 

The Roundtable on Sustainable Palm Oil (RSPO) was established in 2004 following concerns raised by non-governmental organizations about environmental impacts resulting from palm oil production. The organization has established international standards for sustainable palm oil production. Products containing Certified Sustainable Palm Oil (CSPO) can carry the RSPO trademark. Members of the RSPO include palm oil producers, environmental groups, and manufacturers who use palm oil in their products. In 2014, Indonesia accounted for 40% of global palm oil production and 44% of the total RSPO-certified areas.

The RSPO is applying different types of programmes to supply palm oil to producers.

 Book and claim: no guarantee that the end product contains certified sustainable palm oil, supports RSPO-certified growers and farmers
 Identity preserved: the end user is able to trace the palm oil back to a specific single mill and its supply base (plantations)
 Segregated: this option guarantees that the end product contains certified palm oil
 Mass balance: the refinery is only allowed to sell the same amount of mass balance palm oil as the amount of certified sustainable palm oil purchased

GreenPalm is one of the retailers executing the book and claim supply chain and trading programme. It guarantees that the palm oil producer is certified by the RSPO. Through GreenPalm the producer can certify a specified amount with the GreenPalm logo. The buyer of the oil is allowed to use the RSPO and the GreenPalm label for sustainable palm oil on their products.
After the meeting in 2009, a number of environmental organisations were critical of the scope of the agreements reached. Palm oil growers who produce CSPO have been critical of the organization because, though they have met RSPO standards and assumed the costs associated with certification, the market demand for certified palm oil remains low. Low market demand has been attributed to the higher cost of CSPO, leading palm oil buyers to purchase cheaper non-certified palm oil. Palm oil is mostly fungible. In 2011, 12% of palm oil produced was certified "sustainable", though only half of that had the RSPO label. Even with such a low proportion being certified, Greenpeace has argued that confectioners are avoiding responsibilities on sustainable palm oil, because it says that RSPO standards fall short of protecting the environment. Even though deforestation has decreased in RSPO-certified oil palm plantations, peatlands continue to be drained and burned for the creation of new RSPO-certified palm plantations.

Composition

Fatty acids

Palm oil, like all fats, is composed of fatty acids, esterified with glycerol. Palm oil has an especially high concentration of saturated fat, specifically the 16-carbon saturated fatty acid, palmitic acid, to which it gives its name.  Monounsaturated oleic acid is also a major constituent of palm oil. Unrefined palm oil is a significant source of tocotrienol, part of the vitamin E family.

The approximate concentration of esterified fatty acids in palm oil is:

Carotenes
Red palm oil is rich in carotenes, such as alpha-carotene, beta-carotene and lycopene, which give it a characteristic dark red color. However, palm oil that has been refined, bleached and deodorized from crude palm oil (called "RBD palm oil") does not contain carotenes.

Comparison to other vegetable oils

Nutrition and health
Contributing significant calories as a source of fat, palm oil is a food staple in many cuisines. On average globally, humans consumed 7.7 kg (17 lb) of palm oil per person in 2015. Although the relationship of palm oil consumption to disease risk has been previously assessed, the quality of the clinical research specifically assessing palm oil effects has been generally poor. Consequently, research has focused on the deleterious effects of palm oil and palmitic acid consumption as sources of saturated fat content in edible oils, leading to conclusions that palm oil and saturated fats should be replaced with polyunsaturated fats in the diet.

A 2015 meta-analysis and 2017 advisory from the American Heart Association indicated that palm oil is among foods supplying dietary saturated fat which increases blood levels of LDL cholesterol and increased risk of cardiovascular diseases, leading to recommendations for reduced use or elimination of dietary palm oil in favor of consuming unhydrogenated vegetable oils.

Glycidyl fatty acid esters (GE), 3-MCPD and 2-MCPD, are found especially in palm oils and palm fats because of their refining at high temperatures (approx. ). Since glycidol, the parent compound of GE, is considered genotoxic and carcinogenic, the EFSA didn't set a safe level for GE. According to the chair of the CONTAM (EFSA’s expert Panel on Contaminants in the Food Chain), "The exposure to GE of babies consuming solely infant formula is a particular concern as this is up to ten times what would be considered of low concern for public health". The EFSA's tolerable daily intake (TDI) of 3-MCPD and its fatty acid esters was set to 0.8 micrograms per kilogram of body weight per day (µg/kg bw/day) in 2016 and increased to 2 µg/kg bw/day in 2017, based on evidence linking this substance to organ damage in animal tests and on possible adverse effects on the kidney and on male fertility. According to the EFSA, there is not enough data to set a safe level for 2-MCPD.

Palmitic acid

Excessive intake of palmitic acid, which makes up 44% of palm oil, increases blood levels of low-density lipoprotein (LDL) and total cholesterol, and so increases risk of cardiovascular diseases. Other reviews, the World Health Organization, and the US National Heart, Lung and Blood Institute have encouraged consumers to limit the consumption of palm oil, palmitic acid and foods high in saturated fat.

See also

 Coconut oil
 Palm sugar
 Tropical agriculture

Further reading

References

 
Tropical agriculture
Environmental controversies
Crops